Uri Zwick is an Israeli computer scientist and mathematician known for his work on graph algorithms, in particular on distances in graphs and on the color-coding technique for subgraph isomorphism. With Howard Karloff, he is the namesake of the Karloff–Zwick algorithm for approximating the MAX-3SAT problem of Boolean satisfiability. He and his coauthors won the David P. Robbins Prize in 2011 for their work on the block-stacking problem.

Zwick earned a bachelor's degree from the Technion – Israel Institute of Technology, and completed his doctorate at Tel Aviv University in 1989 under the supervision of Noga Alon. He is currently a professor of computer science at Tel Aviv University.

References

External links
Home page

Year of birth missing (living people)
Living people
Israeli computer scientists
Israeli mathematicians
Technion – Israel Institute of Technology alumni
Tel Aviv University alumni
Academic staff of Tel Aviv University